Chusovskoy (masculine), Chusovskaya (feminine), or Chusovskoye (neuter) may refer to:
Chusovskoy Municipal District, a municipal formation which the town of krai significance of Chusovoy in Perm Krai, Russia is incorporated as
Chusovskoye Urban Settlement, a municipal formation in Chusovskoy Municipal District of Perm Krai, Russia, which the town of Chusovoy, one work settlement, and two rural localities are incorporated as
Chusovskoy (rural locality) (Chusovskaya, Chusovskoye), several rural localities in Russia
Lake Chusovskoye, a lake in Perm Krai, Russia